The Davy Tower is a feature of the York city walls in England.

The stone tower was built around 1250, probably at the end of a wall or earthwork leading to Castlegate, around the moat of York Castle.  It was first recorded in 1315, and by 1424 the part of the city inside the walls was occupied by the York Franciscan Friary.  Until 1553, a chain could be strung across the River Ouse from the tower to a now-demolished tower near Skeldergate.  From 1607, a public toilet adjoined the tower, on the river side, known as the "Sugar House".  In 1732, it was replaced by a stone arch, the Friargate Postern.

Around 1730, the tower was altered, when a summerhouse was constructed in its southern corner: the basement in stone, and the raised ground floor in brick.  It was extended in about 1830, and has since filled all but the north-west corner of the tower, which has been demolished.  The building was extended again in the 20th century, incorporating a coal store and a new concrete floor.  In 1954, it was Grade II* listed.

The mediaeval stone wall is about 10 feet high and 1 foot 8 thick, and it retains two original windows: an arrowslit in a cross shape, and a musket loop.  Some internal features survive from the 18th century, including a chimneypiece, window seats, a dado rail with panelling, and a cornice.

References

Grade II* listed buildings in York
Towers completed in the 13th century
Towers in North Yorkshire